114 Tauri, or o Tauri, is a single, blue-white hued star in the zodiac constellation of Taurus. It is a faint star but visible to the naked eye with an apparent visual magnitude of 4.88. It is moving further from the Sun with a heliocentric radial velocity of 16.5 km/s, having come as close as  some 9.6 million years ago. It is a member of the Cas-Tau OB association of co-moving stars, and has a peculiar velocity of 8.3 km/s.

Grenier et al. (1999) assigned this star to a stellar classification of B2.5 IV, which matches the luminosity class of an evolving subgiant star. Abt (2008) listed it as a B-type main-sequence star with a class of B2.5 V. With an age of about 22 million years, 114 Tauri has an estimated 7 times the mass of the Sun and four times the Sun's radius. The star is radiating about 2,454 times the Sun's luminosity from its photosphere at an effective temperature of around 20,700 K. It appears to have a relatively low rotation rate for a star of its mass and age, showing a projected rotational velocity of 10 km/s.

References

External links
 

B-type main-sequence stars
Double stars
Taurus (constellation)
Durchmusterung objects
Tauri, 114
035708
025539
1810